Richland Township is located in LaSalle County, Illinois. As of the 2010 census, its population was 379 and it contained 173 housing units. Richland Township was formed from Bruce Township on an unknown date.

Geography

Demographics

References

External links
US Census
City-data.com
Illinois State Archives

Townships in LaSalle County, Illinois
Townships in Illinois